The Embassy of Palestine in Stockholm;  is the diplomatic mission of the State of Palestine in Sweden. It is the first time a Palestinian embassy has ever opened in a western European nation.

See also

 List of diplomatic missions of Palestine

References

Diplomatic missions of the State of Palestine
Diplomatic missions in Stockholm